The 2020 FBD Insurance Connacht GAA Senior Football Competition was an inter-county Gaelic football competition in the province of Connacht. All five Connacht county teams participated, but there are no college or university teams.

 were the winners.

Competition format
The competition is a straight knockout. Drawn games go to a penalty shoot-out without the playing of extra-time.

Fixtures and results

References

FBD Insurance League
FBD Insurance League